Richard Louis Miller is an American clinical psychologist, author, founder of Wilbur Hot Springs Health Sanctuary, and broadcaster who hosts the Mind Body Health & Politics radio program. The program feature national figures from the world of medicine, psychology and politics. It aired on NPR affiliate KZYX&Z FM & www.KZYX.org until 2018, and continues to stream live on Tuesday mornings at 9am Pacific Time.

History
Miller is founder of Wilbur Hot Springs Health Maintenance Organization providing healing, prevention, and health maintenance.

Miller’s approaches to healing have been the subject of national television news reports (including segments on the news programs of Tom Brokaw, Dan Rather, David Brinkley and Phil Donahue), print media (Time, Newsweek, and U.S. News & World Report), two film documentaries, and the book Gestalting Addiction.  He co-authored a weekly news column in the San Francisco Chronicle, while co-hosting a weekly syndicated radio program.

Radio Program
In addition to continuing his professional work in psychology, Miller currently hosts a weekly, live, call-in, radio program, "Mind Body Health & Politics," on his website MindBodyHealthpolitics.org.  The program formerly aired on NPR affiliate KZYX & Z radio in Mendocino County. In November 2020, Dr. Miller re-launched the program as a live, internet radio broadcast, with his guest, 4-term California Governor Jerry Brown.

Psychedelic Medicine
In 2017, Inner Traditions published Psychedelic Medicine an edited compilation ofMiller's most popular radio interviews on the medicinal uses of psychedelics. The interviewees include Rick Doblin, Stanislav Grof, James Fadiman, Julie Holland, and Dennis McKenna, with each chapter dedicated to a particular substance (i.e., LSD, MDMA, Psilocybin, and Ayahuasca). The final chapter compares this approach to the traditional approach of psychiatric medication, based on the work of investigative journalist Robert Whitaker – author of Anatomy of an Epidemic.

References

External links
 MindBodyHealthPolitics.org
 Wilbur Hot Springs 
 Wilbur Hot Springs Institute for Ecology and Health

American health and wellness writers
American medical writers
American male non-fiction writers
American talk radio hosts
1939 births
Living people
People from Tiburon, California
University of Michigan faculty
University of Michigan alumni
American clinical psychologists